Gymnoris is a genus of passerine birds in the sparrow family Passeridae. Three species are found in Africa while the yellow-throated sparrow ranges from Turkey to India.

The genus was introduced by the English zoologist Edward Blyth in 1845 with the yellow-throated sparrow as the type species. The name combines the Ancient Greek words gumnos "bare" or "naked" and rhinos "nostrils".

There are four species recognized:

These species are sometimes placed in the genus Petronia.

References 

 
Passeridae
Bird genera
Taxa named by Edward Blyth